Unni Mary is an Indian actress who works mainly in Malayalam films. She has also worked in Telugu, Tamil and Kannada films, where she had used the screen name Deepa.

Personal life
Unnimary was born to Augustine Fernandes and Victoria. She had her primary education from St. Teresa's Convent School, Ernakulam. She has a brother, Joseph Martin. She started learning classical dance from the age of three. Her mother used to own a ballet troupe and she performed in many stages in India and abroad.

She married Rejoy, a professor at St. Albert's College, Ernakulam on 12 March 1982, and they have a son, Nirmal. Their son Nirmal is married to Ranjini and they have a son, Rihan.

Filmography

Malayalam

Tamil

Telugu

Kannada

Hindi

References

External links
 
 Unnimary at MSI

Year of birth missing (living people)
21st-century Indian actresses
Indian film actresses
Actresses in Tamil cinema
Living people
Actresses in Malayalam cinema
Actresses from Kochi
Indian women film producers
Film producers from Kochi
Actresses in Telugu cinema
Actresses in Kannada cinema
20th-century Indian actresses
Actresses in Hindi cinema
Businesswomen from Kerala
St. Teresa's College alumni